The following ships are named for Prairial:
 , one of the 
  of the French Navy, sunk in a collision in April 1918.
 , a frigate of the French Navy

Citations

Ship names